The 2021 Arachas Super 20 Trophy was the Twenty20 section of the seventh Women's Super Series competition that took place in Ireland from 3 May to 15 August 2021. The tournament ran alongside the 50 over Arachas Super 50 Cup. 

Originally the opening match of the tournament was scheduled to take place on 6 June 2021, but it was held on 3 May according to the revised fixtures of the tournament. On 30 April 2021, Cricket Ireland released the revised fixtures of the series, with two teams taking part. Although the previous editions of the tournament were competed between three teams, due to the impact of COVID-19 pandemic, the 2021 season featured two teams, with Arachas named as the title sponsors of the event.

In April 2021, Cricket Ireland announced the playing squads for both teams, with Laura Delany and Gaby Lewis named as the captains for the Typhoons and the Scorchers respectively. Scorchers won the tournament, winning four of the six matches.

Competition format 
In the Super 20 Trophy, the two sides played each other in six Twenty20 matches between May and August. The tournament worked on a league system.

The league worked on a points system with positions being based on the total points. Points were awarded as follows:

Win: 2 points. 
Tie: 1 point. 
Loss: 0 points.
Abandoned/No Result: 1 point.

Squads

Points table

Fixtures

1st T20

2nd T20

3rd T20

4th T20

5th T20

6th T20

References

External links
 Series home at ESPNcricinfo

2021 in Irish cricket
Women's Super Series